James Kudelka, OC (born September 10, 1955 at Newmarket, Ontario), is a Canadian choreographer, dancer, and director. He was the artistic director of the National Ballet of Canada from 1996 to 2005, now serving as the National Ballet's artist in residence.

Biography
Kudelka began choreographing while a student at the National Ballet School. He gained critical attention for dramatic ballets such as A Party (1976) and Washington Square (1979).

Les Grand Ballet Canadiens 
Frustrated by what he saw as a lack of creative commitment at the National Ballet, Kudelka joined Les Grands Ballet Canadiens in 1981 where he was a principal dancer. There his choreography changed toward a less dramatic style in works such as In Paradisum (1983) and Alliances (1984).

He was resident choreographer of Les Grands Ballets from 1984 to 1990, while also creating works for other companies such as the Joffrey Ballet, the San Francisco Ballet and the American Ballet Theatre.

Artistic Director 
Kudelka returned to the National Ballet of Canada as artist in residence in 1992. Kudelka reworked The Nutcracker, for the National Ballet in 1995. The production's success led Kudelka to be appointed artistic director after Reid Anderson resigned due to frustration over government funding cuts.

As artistic director, Kudelka commissioned works from Dominique Dumais and Matjash Mrozewski and from Montréal modernist Jean-Pierre Perreault. He also continued to choreograph for the company, including new versions of Swan Lake and Cinderella. He also several pieces from George Balanchine.

In October 1998, Kudelka took his company on a critically acclaimed tour to New York and on a United States tour in 2004.

Wrongful Dismissal Suit 

In 1998, principal dancer Kimberly Glasco filed a wrongful dismissal suit against the National Ballet of Canada instigated because artistic director Kudelka dropped her from the company roster, allegedly because Glasco had questioned the allocation of funds for his version of Swan Lake. She said that Kudelka told her he was letting her go because she had opposed his plans to spend $1.6 million on the new production and because she had opposed his appointment as artistic director. At the time, the National was nearly $3 million in debt. Glasco also filed complaints with Ontario's Labour Relations Board and Human Rights Commission.

Kudelka maintained that her contract was not renewed for artistic and financial reasons. He alleged that her dancing was not as strong as it had been and that her dismissal was part of a larger strategy to expand the size of the ballet when cutbacks had reduced its budget from $16 million to $14 million. The company's founder Celia Franca and executive director Valerie Wilder spoke out in support of the artistic director. Glasco had the support of former National star Vanessa Harwood, Canadian Auto Workers boss Buzz Hargrove, Dr. Nancy Olivieri and Betty Oliphant.

On March 18, 1999, the National agreed to meet Glasco for private mediation which replaced both the Labour Relations complaint and lawsuit. The case was reportedly settled for $1.6 million in Glasco's favour.

Resident Choreographer 

He resigned as artistic director in 2005, being succeeded by retired ballet dancer and artistic associate Karen Kain. He was appointed as an Officer of the Order of Canada the same year. Kudelka now serves as the National Ballet's artist in residence.

In 2008, he was named resident choreographer for the contemporary dance company Coleman Lemieux & Compagnie, which performs both existing and new works.

In Media 
He was profiled in Moze Mossanen's 1987 documentary film Dance for Modern Times, alongside David Earle, Christopher House, Ginette Laurin and Danny Grossman.

Personal life 
Kudelka identifies as gay.

Selected choreographed works

 1990 Symphony No. 6 for Pastorale
 1991 Fifteen Heterosexual Duets
 1991 Musings
 1993  The Miraculous Mandarin
 1994 Spring Awakening
 1994 The Actress
 1994 Gluck Pas de Deux
 1995 The Nutcracker
 1996 Cruel World
 1997 The Four Seasons
 1997 Terra Firma
 1998 Désir
 1999 Swan Lake
 1999 A Disembodied Voice
 2000 The Firebird
 2002 The Contract
 2003 The End
 2003 There, below
 2004 Cinderella
 2004 Chacony
 2005 An Italian Straw Hat
 2005 Romeo and Juliet before parting
 2005 Full Circles
 2013 ... black night’s bright day ...

References

1955 births
Living people
Canadian male ballet dancers
Ballet choreographers
Canadian choreographers
Officers of the Order of Canada
Gay entertainers
LGBT dancers
LGBT choreographers
People from Newmarket, Ontario
20th-century ballet dancers
21st-century ballet dancers
20th-century Canadian dancers
21st-century Canadian dancers
20th-century Canadian LGBT people
21st-century Canadian LGBT people
Canadian gay men